Edith Eliot Rotch (August 11, 1874-December 11, 1969) was an American tennis player of the start of the 20th century. Born and raised in greater Boston, she was a 1901 magna cum laude graduate of Radcliffe College in Cambridge, Massachusetts. During a successful tennis career, on three occasions, she won the US Women's National Championship : in mixed doubles in 1908 (with Nathaniel Niles) and in women's doubles with Hazel Hotchkiss Wightman in 1909 and 1910. In addition to tennis, she won local trophies in ice skating. By the late 1910s, she had become active in amateur radio. Her ham call letters were 1RO, and later 1ZR. She had her own ham station and administered the licensing exam to other amateurs.

Grand Slam finals

Doubles (2 titles)

Mixed doubles (1 title)

References

 

1874 births
American female tennis players
1969 deaths
Grand Slam (tennis) champions in women's doubles
Grand Slam (tennis) champions in mixed doubles
Radcliffe College alumni
United States National champions (tennis)
Tennis players from Boston